Baghuni (also Romanized as Bāghūnī) is a village in Tiab Rural District, in the Central District of Minab County, Hormozgan Province, Iran. At the 2006 census, its population was 318, in 58 families.

References 

Populated places in Minab County